Hanna Miluska (born 29 May 1984) is a Swiss former swimmer, who specialized in freestyle events and open water marathon. She is a two-time medalist in the 5 km open water at the World and European Championships. Miluska is also a member of Beider Basel Swimming Club, and is trained by her long-time coach Axel Mitbauer. She is also the daughter of former rower Ivan Miluška, who played for Czechoslovakia in the men's pairs at the 1968 Summer Olympics in Mexico City.

Miluska made her own sporting history in 2002 as an open water swimmer. She won a total of two medals in the 5 km open water: silver at the European Championships in Berlin (1:00:27), and bronze at the FINA World Championships in Sharm el-Sheikh, Egypt (58:13).

Two years later, Miluska qualified for two swimming events at the 2004 Summer Olympics in Athens, by clearing a FINA B-standard entry time of 2:02.65 (200 m freestyle) from the World Championships in Barcelona, Spain. In the 200 m freestyle, Miluska challenged seven other swimmers on the third heat, including three-time Olympian Olena Lapunova of Ukraine. She edged out Argentina's Florencia Szigeti to take a second spot and twenty-fourth overall by 0.01 of a second in 2:03.28.

Miluska also teamed up with Chantal Strasser, Flavia Rigamonti, and Nicole Zahnd in the 4 × 200 m freestyle relay. Swimming the second leg, she recorded a split of 57.60, and the Swiss team finished the heats in twelfth overall with a final time of 2:02.75.

Miluska is also a former varsity for the Alabama Crimson Tide, and a graduate of political science at the University of Alabama in Tuscaloosa, Alabama.

References

External links
Player Bio – Alabama Crimson Tide

1984 births
Living people
Olympic swimmers of Switzerland
Swimmers at the 2004 Summer Olympics
Swiss female freestyle swimmers
Swiss female long-distance swimmers
Alabama Crimson Tide women's swimmers
World Aquatics Championships medalists in swimming
European Aquatics Championships medalists in swimming
Sportspeople from Basel-Landschaft
21st-century Swiss women